Faculty of History may refer to:

 Faculty of History, University of Cambridge
 Faculty of History, University of Oxford
 MSU Faculty of History (Moscow State University)